Martin John Brundle (born 1 June 1959) is a British former racing driver, best known as a Formula One driver and as a commentator for ITV Sport from 1997 to 2008, the BBC from 2009 to 2011, and Sky Sports since 2012.

Brundle contested the 1983 British Formula Three Championship, finishing a close second to Ayrton Senna, and the two progressed to Formula One the next year. Brundle was the 1988 World Sportscar Champion with Silk Cut Jaguar, with a record points score; and won the 1988 24 Hours of Daytona, and the 1990 24 Hours of Le Mans for Jaguar Cars.

Career

Early racing career 
Brundle had an unorthodox route to Formula One. He began his racing career at the age of 12, competing in grass track racing, in the Norfolk village of Pott Row. In 1975, he moved to Hot Rod racing and received 'Star grade' status. In 1979, he started single seater racing in Formula Ford. During this time he also raced Tom Walkinshaw's BMW touring cars, during which he finished second against a field of international drivers at Snetterton. He won the BMW championship in 1980, and partnered Stirling Moss in the TWR-run BP/Audi team during the 1981 British Saloon Car Championship season. In 1982, he moved up to Formula Three achieving five pole positions and two wins in his debut season. He won the Grovewood Award as the most promising Commonwealth driver. The next year, he competed with Ayrton Senna for the Formula Three championship, which Brundle lost on the final laps of the last race. In 1984, he was offered a Formula One entry.

Formula One (1984–1987)
He put in a number of aggressive and fast drives, finishing fifth in his first race in Brazil and then second in Detroit before being disqualified. At the 1984 Dallas Grand Prix Brundle broke his ankles and both feet in a crash during a practice session, and was forced to miss the rest of the season while he recuperated; the severity of the damage to Brundle's left ankle initially led doctors to consider amputating his left foot. While Brundle did recover, the damage would leave him with permanent injuries, preventing him from running and left-foot braking. Later in the year Tyrrell were disqualified from the World Championship due to a technical infringement and Brundle's achievements for that season were wiped from the record books.For the next two seasons he remained with Tyrrell, and despite the team's switch from the Cosworth DFV to the turbocharged Renault engines in mid-, the team struggled against the works teams. He scored only eight points in his time with Tyrrell, all in the  season. In  he left Tyrrell and moved to the struggling West German team Zakspeed, but scored only two points during the year; both were scored for finishing fifth at the 1987 San Marino Grand Prix. The Zakspeed 871 car was unable to compete with the front runners. The two points scored by Brundle in 1987 were the only points the Zakspeed team scored in their five-year (1985–89) run in Formula One. Ironically, the driver he replaced at Zakspeed, fellow Englishman Jonathan Palmer, would join Tyrrell in 1987 who were once again using a Cosworth engine. While Brundle only had one point scoring finish for the season, Palmer would go on to score six World Championship points for Tyrrell and would also win the Jim Clark Cup as the 'Atmo Champion' for drivers of cars with naturally aspirated engines.

Sportscars and Brabham (1988–1991)
Four years of Formula One racing for underfunded teams led Brundle to seek a new challenge, and thus in 1988 he took a year out. Brundle had been associated with Jaguar since 1983, when he drove TWR-prepared Jaguar XJS touring cars in the European Touring Car Championship. From his two starts with the Jaguar team Brundle took two victories, the second in partnership with TWR owner Tom Walkinshaw. When Jaguar decided to return to the World Sportscar Championship and the American IMSA championship, in partnership with TWR, Walkinshaw chose Brundle as his lead driver. The team performed well in the 1988 World Sportscar Championship season, and Brundle won the world sportscar title with a record points haul. He also won the Daytona 24 Hours the same year. He became the test driver for Williams and stood in for Nigel Mansell at the 1988 Belgian Grand Prix, after Mansell was struck down with chickenpox. Brundle was to have driven Mansell's Williams-Judd again at the next race at Monza in Italy but prior IMSA commitments with TWR saw the drive go to fellow World Sportscar Championship contender Jean-Louis Schlesser instead (as no WSC race clashed with the Italian GP). Schlesser would infamously be involved in the incident which caused the retirement of McLaren's Ayrton Senna late in the race, handing the win to Ferrari's Gerhard Berger and causing McLaren's only loss of the  season.

In  he returned to Formula One full-time with the returning Brabham team who would be running the Judd V8 engine. But while the former champions were initially competitive, with Brundle running third at Monaco until a flat battery forced him to pit for a replacement while his teammate Stefano Modena finishing third, Brabham were unable to recapture their early past success and Brundle, who had failed to pre-qualify for both the Canadian and French races during the season opted to move back into the sports car arena for 1990. His 1990 24 Hours of Le Mans victory rejuvenated his career, but still a top-line race seat in Formula One eluded him. As well as contesting races in sports prototypes, Brundle also contested the American IROC series in 1990. He took victory at the temporary circuit at Burke Lakefront Airport (the only IROC victory for a British driver) and finished third in the overall standings. In 1991 he rejoined Brabham, but the squad had fallen even further down the grid and good results were sparse.

Formula One (1992–1996)

Seasoned observers noticed Brundle's drives into the points in the uncompetitive Brabham Yamaha in 1991, which was the last points finish for the Brabham team. This helped Brundle get a 1992 switch to Benetton, with whom he would finally claim a recognised podium finish and consistent points finishes with some gritty drives.

In 1992 he had a productive season, with a strong finish to the year. He came close to a win at Canada, where having overtaken Schumacher and closing on leader Gerhard Berger, the transmission failed. He never outqualified teammate Michael Schumacher, but made up places with excellent starts (sixth to third at Silverstone), outraced the German at Imola, Montreal, Magny-Cours and Silverstone, and scored a notable second place at Monza. At Spa, Brundle went by when Schumacher went off the track. Schumacher noticed blisters on his teammate's tyres on his return to the circuit and came in for slicks, a move that won him the race. Had Brundle not been distracted he would have pitted as planned at the end of that lap, with victory the most likely result.

To the shock of the F1 paddock, Brundle found himself dropped from Benetton for 1993, Italian Riccardo Patrese taking his place. He came very close to a seat with world champions Williams, but in the end Damon Hill got the drive instead. Still in demand within F1, Brundle raced for Ligier in 1993. More points finishes and a fine third at Imola were achieved in a car without active suspension. With finishing 7th in the World Drivers' Championship behind the two Williams drivers Alain Prost (1st) and Damon Hill (3rd), McLaren team leader Ayrton Senna (2nd), the Benetton drivers Michael Schumacher (4th) and Riccardo Patrese (5th) and the Ferrari driver Jean Alesi (6th), Brundle was the most successful driver who did not have an active suspension system in his car and Ligier were the most successful team without an active suspension.

For 1994 Brundle was in the frame for the vacant McLaren seat alongside Mika Häkkinen. McLaren were hopeful of re-signing Alain Prost, who had retired at the end of 1993 after winning his fourth championship title, but decided not to renege on his retirement in March, and Brundle got the drive, beating out McLaren test driver Philippe Alliot. He was confirmed less than two weeks before the season-opening 1994 Brazilian Grand Prix.

Joining the team was a case of bad timing in many ways. McLaren were on a downturn and throughout 1994 were unable to win a Grand Prix for the first time since . The team's V10 Peugeot engines were unreliable, as was to be expected from a debuting engine supplier. In the first race Brundle narrowly escaped serious injury or worse in a spectacular accident involving Jos Verstappen; his helmet took a heavy blow as the Benetton cartwheeled overhead. At Aida his engine blew whilst running third while at Silverstone his engine appeared to explode just as the starting lights turned green. In reality the culprit was a clutch that cracked spilling its lubricants on top of the hot engine causing a spectacular fire. The engine, once cleaned, worked without problem. Another sure third place was lost on the last lap in Hungary. Nevertheless, when the car was reliable, Brundle put in strong performances that season, most notably at Monaco where he finished second to Schumacher.

Having had poor luck and with Mansell signed to McLaren for 1995, Brundle once more raced for Ligier that year, although not for the full season. To appease Mugen-Honda he had to share the second seat with Aguri Suzuki, a move denounced by many commentators and fans. He impressed however, with a strong fourth at Magny-Cours and what would be his last F1 podium, at Spa, being the highlights. In 1996 he teamed up with Rubens Barrichello at Jordan and enjoyed a good season, despite a slow start and a spectacular crash at Melbourne's inaugural GP, with regular points, fourth his best result. He finished fifth in the 1996 Japanese Grand Prix, which was his last Grand Prix in Formula One.

Brundle achieved 9 podiums, and scored a total of 98 championship points, with a best championship finish of 6th in 1992. He was especially strong on street circuits and similarly slow-speed, twisty courses – Monaco, Adelaide and the Hungaroring each produced 4 points finishes for him.

After Formula One

Commentator
Brundle had hoped to stay in F1 beyond 1996, but could not find a seat.  He was offered a seat at Sauber in 1997 following the dropping of Nicola Larini, but decided against it. Brundle did however return to Le Mans. Drives for Nissan, Toyota and Bentley impressed, but a second victory failed to materialise. Brundle returned to Le Mans in 2012 but previous to that last raced in 2001, between which he focused on his role with the British Racing Drivers' Club (BRDC).

Having largely retired from motor racing, Brundle became a highly regarded commentator on British television network ITV, whom he joined when they began Formula One coverage in 1997, initially alongside Murray Walker, and from 2002 James Allen. Brundle joined the BBC's commentary team alongside Jonathan Legard when they won back the rights to show F1 from 2009. Before the start of the  season, the BBC announced that Brundle was being promoted to lead commentator and would be joined by fellow former F1 driver, David Coulthard. He signed for Sky Sports' coverage at the end of 2011. At Sky Brundle returned to a co-commentary role, working alongside lead commentator David Croft.

For his television work Brundle has won the RTS Television Sports Award for best Sports Pundit in 1998, 1999, 2005 and 2006. In 2005 the judges described him as:

The production company responsible for ITV's F1 coverage, North One Television, also won the Sports Innovation Award for its Insight features, presented by Brundle. His pre-race grid walks are now customary and began at the 1997 British Grand Prix. Discussing the return of Formula One to the BBC in 2009, The Times described Brundle "as the greatest TV analyst in this or any other sport."

Before becoming a regular commentator, Brundle was also part of the 1995 BBC commentary team whenever Aguri Suzuki was driving the Ligier-Mugen Honda, such as the 1995 San Marino Grand Prix. He also commentated on Eurosport for a handful of qualifying sessions in 1995.

With Steve Rider busy covering the England versus Kazakhstan 2010 FIFA World Cup Group 6 qualification match, Brundle co-commentated and presented coverage of the 2008 Japanese Grand Prix at Fuji Speedway.

Motorsport activities

Brundle took the wheel of a Jaguar F1 car for the Formula One demonstration in London prior to the 2004 British Grand Prix and drove a BMW Sauber during a demonstration in 2006. Also in 2006, Brundle drove a 2005 Red Bull Racing car around Silverstone as part of ITV's 'F1 Insight' feature. This was followed up in 2007 with Brundle and colleague Blundell both driving Williams F1 cars to demonstrate overtaking.

In 2008 he came out of retirement to drive in the Formula Palmer Audi Championship alongside his son Alex, who was a series regular.  He scored three top-eight finishes from the three races in which he took part.

Brundle came out of retirement again to race for United Autosports in the 2011 Daytona 24 Hours, sharing a Ford-powered Riley with Zak Brown, Mark Patterson and former Ligier and Brabham teammate Blundell; the team finished fourth overall.

In June 2011, shortly before the 2011 European Grand Prix, Brundle completed a one-off Formula One test for the series' tyre supplier Pirelli at Jerez. He completed a total of 70 laps on all of their tyre compounds, with the results and events of the day aired before the 2011 Hungarian Grand Prix.

In June 2012, Brundle made a return to competitive racing at the 24 Hours of Le Mans, teaming up with son Alex to race a Greaves Motorsport-run Zytek-Nissan LMP2. His first appearance at the French classic in over a decade, Brundle worked hard to get back into adequate physical condition – using his son's race-training exercise programme for a year in preparation. Their car finished 15th out of the 56 runners, completing 340 laps.

Other activities

Brundle has been involved in driver management. At present, he is David Coulthard's manager (as well as his former co-commentator). He co-owned a management company, 2MB Sports Management, alongside Mark Blundell until January 2009, when he announced his intention to step down in order to focus on his television responsibilities and his son's career. Their clients include McLaren test driver Gary Paffett and British Formula 3 champion Mike Conway.

Brundle presented a documentary on British television in 1998 called Great Escapes, which showed generally live recordings, and occasionally reconstructions, of stories where human beings managed to somehow survive in face of various dangers or perils. It ran for one series on ITV.

In 2004 he released his first book Working the Wheel. The title is a reference to his 1996 crash in Melbourne.

In June 2013 he released his second book The Martin Brundle Scrapbook, co-authored with Philip Porter, a biography that tells the story of his life through memorabilia, news cuttings and photographs.

On Friday 13 February 2009, Brundle presented BBC Look Easts 6.30 pm bulletin, with Susie Fowler-Watt, reproducing his famous gridwalk.

 Criticism of Max Mosley and the FIA 
In September 2007, he suggested that the treatment of McLaren "had the feel of a witch hunt" in his Sunday Times column. As a result of these comments, Brundle and the Sunday Times received a French writ from Max Mosley and the FIA for libel. In the same column on 9 December 2007 he accused the FIA of double standards and of issuing the writ at the same time as clearing Renault of spying as a warning to other journalists:
The timing of the writ is significant, in my view, given the FIA's decision to find Renault guilty of having significant McLaren designs and information within their systems, but not administering any penalty. It is a warning sign to other journalists and publications to choose their words carefully over that decision. I'm tired of what I perceive as the "spin" and tactics of the FIA press office, as are many other journalists. I expect my accreditation pass for next year will be hindered in some way to make my coverage of F1 more difficult and to punish me. Or they will write to ITV again to say that my commentary is not up to standard despite my unprecedented six Royal Television Society Awards for sports broadcasting. So be it.

Brundle also asserted his right to voice his opinion about Formula One:
As a former Formula One driver, I have earned the right to have an opinion about the sport, and probably know as much about it as anybody else. I have attended approaching 400 grands prix, 158 as a driver. I have spilt blood, broken bones, shed tears, generated tanker loads of sweat, tasted the champagne glories and plumbed the depths of misery. I have never been more passionate about F1 and will always share my opinions in an honest and open way, knowing readers will make up their own minds.

In March 2008, Brundle voiced his opinion regarding the position of Max Mosley following the News of The World's allegation that Mosley had engaged in sexual acts with five prostitutes in a scenario that involved Nazi role-playing; saying "It's not appropriate behaviour for the head of any global body such as the FIA." In April, Brundle argued:
The specific detail of the scandal surrounding him is largely irrelevant, in my view. The sporting regulation he has used over the years to keep teams in check relates to bringing the sport into disrepute. If you live by the sword, you die by the sword. Sitting on the fence on this issue for any of us inside the sport is not an option. We must condone or condemn the situation he finds himself in. Mosley's position as president is untenable.

Helmet

Brundle's helmet was white with two red stripes and a blue stripe between the two red stripes (inspired by the British flag) from the chin to the back of the helmet.
In 1996, a golden ring (with either 'Benson and Hedges' or 'Brundle' written on it) and a blue drawing resembling a B (a representation of his trademark "start the engine" gesture) were added.

Personal life
The son of a motor car dealer, he and his brother Robin took over the family car dealership from their father. The business closed in 2003 after losing the local Toyota and Peugeot franchises. Robin is also a racing driver, who competes in historic racing events, and was managing director of Lola Cars.

Brundle is married to Liz and they have a daughter, Charlie, and a son, Alex. Alex has followed his father in pursuing a career in driving; he competed in the 2012 GP3 Series and the FIA World Endurance Championship. Brundle has always lived within a 10-mile radius of King's Lynn, and currently lives in Gayton, Norfolk.

In 2017, Brundle disclosed that while covering the 2016 Monaco Grand Prix for Sky Sports, he suffered a heart attack whilst running to do the podium interviews.

Legacy
In 2016, in an academic paper that reported a mathematical modeling study that assessed the relative influence of driver and machine, Brundle was ranked the 30th best Formula One driver of all time.

Motion picture writer/director David Cronenberg, a motor racing enthusiast, named the protagonist of his 1986 film The Fly "Seth Brundle" after Martin Brundle. The protagonist of the film's sequel, The Fly II (1989) is Seth Brundle's son "Martin Brundle."

Racing record

Career summary

† As Brundle was a guest driver, he was ineligible for championship points.

Complete British Saloon Car Championship results
(key) (Races in bold indicate pole position; races in italics indicate fastest lap.)

† Events with 2 races staged for the different classes.

Complete British Formula 3 results
(key) (Races in bold indicate pole position) (Races in italics indicate fastest lap)
{| class="wikitable" style="text-align:center; font-size:90%"
! Year
! Entrant
! Engine
! 1
! 2
! 3
! 4
! 5
! 6
! 7
! 8
! 9
! 10
! 11
! 12
! 13
! 14
! 15
! 16
! 17
! 18
! 19
! 20
! DC
! Pts
|-
| 1982
! David Price Racing
! Volkswagen
|style="background:#DFDFDF;"|SIL
|style="background:#CFCFFF;"|THR
|style="background:#FFDF9F;"|SIL
|DON
|style="background:#CFCFFF;"|THR|style="background:#CFCFFF;"|MAL
|style="background:#DFFFDF;"|SNE
|style="background:#DFFFDF;"|SIL
|style="background:#DFFFDF;"|CAD|style="background:#FFDF9F;"|SIL
|style="background:#DFFFDF;"|BRH
|style="background:#CFCFFF;"|MAL
|style="background:#CFCFFF;"|OUL
|style="background:#DFDFDF;"|BRH
|style="background:#CFCFFF;"|SIL
|style="background:#DFFFDF;"|SNE|style="background:#FFFFBF;"|OUL
|style="background:#CFCFFF;"|SIL
|style="background:#DFDFDF;"|BRH
|style="background:#FFFFBF;"|THR!4th!60|-
| 1983
! Eddie Jordan Racing
! Toyota
|style="background:#DFDFDF;"|SIL
|style="background:#DFDFDF;"|THR
|style="background:#DFDFDF;"|SIL
|style="background:#DFDFDF;"|DON
|style="background:#DFDFDF;"|THR
|style="background:#FFDF9F;"|SIL
|style="background:#DFDFDF;"|THR
|style="background:#DFDFDF;"|BRH
|style="background:#DFDFDF;"|SIL
|style="background:#CFCFFF;"|SIL|style="background:#FFFFBF;"|CAD
|style="background:#FFFFBF;"|SNE|style="background:#DFDFDF;"|SIL
|style="background:#FFFFBF;"|DON
|style="background:#EFCFFF;"|OUL|style="background:#DFDFDF;"|SIL
|style="background:#FFFFBF;"|OUL
|style="background:#FFFFBF;"|THR
|style="background:#FFFFBF;"|SIL
|style="background:#FFDF9F;"|THR
|style="background:#DFDFDF;"|2nd|style="background:#DFDFDF;"|
|}

 Brundle was ineligible to score points as he was using European specification tyres. Allen Berg therefore secured maximum points at this round.

Complete European Touring Car Championship results
(key) (Races in bold indicate pole position) (Races in italics indicate fastest lap)

† Not eligible for points.

Complete Formula One results
(key)

Notes
 – Tyrrell were disqualified from the entire world championship for 1984 due to a technical infringement.
† Did not finish, but was classified as he had completed more than 90% of the race distance.

Complete World Sportscar Championship results
(key) (Races in bold' indicate pole position) (Races in italics'' indicate fastest lap)

Complete 24 Hours of Le Mans results

 After electrical problems with his own car, Brundle replaced Eliseo Salazar in the Jaguar #3 car en route to victory.

Complete WRC results

References

External links

 
 Quotes as an ITV commentator 
 Fan site (archived)

English racing drivers
English Formula One drivers
Grovewood Award winners
Tyrrell Formula One drivers
Zakspeed Formula One drivers
Williams Formula One drivers
Brabham Formula One drivers
Benetton Formula One drivers
Ligier Formula One drivers
McLaren Formula One drivers
Jordan Formula One drivers
International Race of Champions drivers
British Formula Three Championship drivers
British Touring Car Championship drivers
British sports broadcasters
Motorsport announcers
Sportspeople from King's Lynn
Segrave Trophy recipients
1959 births
Living people
BRDC Gold Star winners
Formula Palmer Audi drivers
24 Hours of Le Mans drivers
24 Hours of Le Mans winning drivers
24 Hours of Daytona drivers
BBC sports presenters and reporters
Formula One journalists and reporters
World Sportscar Championship drivers
FIA World Endurance Championship drivers
Toyota Gazoo Racing drivers
David Price Racing drivers
Greaves Motorsport drivers
United Autosports drivers
Nismo drivers
Jaguar Racing drivers
Le Mans Cup drivers